Life Is Messy is the seventh studio album by American country music artist Rodney Crowell, released in 1992 by Columbia Records. It peaked at number 30 on the Top Country Albums chart. The songs, "Lovin' All Night", "What Kind of Love", "It's Not for Me to Judge", and "Let's Make Trouble" were released as singles.

Content
The album's first two singles, "Lovin' All Night" and "What Kind of Love", were both released as singles. They respectively reached No. 10 and No. 11 on the Hot Country Songs charts in 1992.

"The Answer Is Yes" was covered by Michelle Wright on her 1996 album For Me It's You, while "Lovin' All Night" was covered by Patty Loveless on her 2003 album On Your Way Home.

Critical reception

William Ruhlmann of Allmusic rated the album 4.5 out of 5 stars, concluding his review with, "Taken together, the songs on Life Is Messy made for a fascinating portrait of an artist at a personal and professional crossroad -- but it didn't have much to do with commercial country music circa 1992, which is what it was primarily marketed as." He compared the songs' sounds primarily to "a pastiche of late-'50s/early-'60s pop". A review by Jack Hurst in the Chicago Tribune rated the album 3.5 out of 4, saying that the album had "a throbbing sound that is out on the pop-ish progressive end of the country spectrum, it treats life in all its surreal hurtfulness without neglecting its epic joys." A less positive review came from Alanna Nash of Entertainment Weekly, who thought that the album showed emotional influence from Crowell's then-recent divorce from fellow musician Rosanne Cash, and highlighted the song "I Hardly Know How to Be Myself", which the two wrote, as the best song on the album. She also compared Crowell's voice favorably to Roy Orbison but added that "too many of his songs splinter into nebulousness with the occasional joltingly bad line".

Track listing

Personnel
From Life Is Messy liner notes.

Musicians

"It's Not for Me to Judge"
Marc Cohn - background vocals
Bobby Colomby - background vocals
John Leventhal - electric guitar, acoustic guitar
Jeff Porcaro - drums
Michael Rhodes - bass guitar
Steuart Smith - electric guitar, slide guitar
C. J. Vanston - keyboards

"What Kind of Love"
Mickey Curry - drums
Don Henley - background vocals
Booker T. Jones - organ
Larry Klein - bass guitar, keyboards
Linda Ronstadt - background vocals
Steuart Smith - guitars

"Lovin' All Night"
 Eddie Bayers - drums
 Barry Beckett - electric piano
 Rodney Crowell - acoustic guitar, percussion
 Jim Horn - saxophone
 John Leventhal - guitars, percussion
 Michael Rhodes - bass guitar
 Vince Santoro - background vocals
 Lari White - background vocals

"Life Is Messy"
 Eddie Bayers - drums, percussion
 Vicki Hampton - background vocals
 John Leventhal - guitars
 Jonell Mosser - background vocals
 Michael Rhodes - bass guitar
 C. J. Vanston - keyboards
 Lari White - background vocals
 Steve Winwood - background vocals

"I Hardly Know How to Be Myself"
 Eddie Bayers - drums
 Barry Beckett - organ
 John Leventhal - piano, guitars
 Leland Sklar - bass guitar

"It Don't Get Better than This"
 Larry Byrom - background vocals
 Jim Lauderdale - background vocals
 Albert Lee - background vocals
 John Leventhal - guitar, bass guitar, piano, background vocals
Larrie Londin - drums

"Alone but Not Alone"
Vinnie Colaiuta - percussion
Shawn Colvin - background vocals
Larry Klein - bass guitar, tremolo guitar, background vocals
Steuart Smith - guitars

"Let's Make Trouble"
Alex Acuña - drums, percussion
Larry Klein - bass guitar, keyboards
Reginal Sales - slack drum
Steuart Smith - guitars
Sam Phillips - background vocals

"The Answer Is Yes"
 Eddie Bayers - drums
 Barry Beckett - organ
 Vicki Hampton - background vocals
 John Leventhal - guitars
 Vince Santoro - background vocals
 Leland Sklar - bass guitar
 Steve Winwood - background vocals

"Maybe Next Time"
 Barry Beckett - organ
 John Leventhal - keyboards, guitar, percussion
 Larrie Londin - drums, percussion
 Vince Santoro - background vocals
 Lari White - background vocals

Technical
 Michael Brauer - mixing (tracks 1, 3, 4, 5, 6, 9, 10)
 Bobby Colomby - production
 Rodney Crowell - production
 Jim Dineen - engineering (tracks 1, 6, 10)
 Larry Klein - production
 John Leventhal - production
 Dan Marnien - engineering and mixing (tracks 2, 7, 8)
 Roger Nichols - engineering (tracks 3, 4, 5, 9)
 C. J. Vanston - production
 Michael Verdick - engineering (track 1)

Chart performance

Album

Singles

Sources

1992 albums
Rodney Crowell albums
Albums produced by Bobby Colomby
Albums produced by Rodney Crowell
Albums produced by Larry Klein
Albums produced by John Leventhal
Columbia Records albums